Johnny Dunbar, nicknamed "Vet", is an American former Negro league catcher who played in the 1930s.

Dunbar played for the Indianapolis Athletics and the Memphis Red Sox in 1937. In 15 recorded games, he posted 16 hits with two home runs and 13 RBI in 52 plate appearances.

References

External links
 and Seamheads

Year of birth missing
Place of birth missing
Indianapolis Athletics players
Memphis Red Sox players
Date of birth missing
Baseball catchers